José Estrada (11 October 1938 – 23 August 1986) was a Mexican film director and screenwriter. He directed 19 films between 1971 and 1985. His 1985 film Mexican, You Can Do It was entered into the 14th Moscow International Film Festival.

Selected filmography
 Para servir a usted (1971)
 Cayó de la gloria el diablo  (1972)
 Los cacos (1972)
 Chabelo y Pepito contra los monstruos  (1973)
 Uno y medio contra el mundo (1973)
 El profeta Mimí
 Chabelo y Pepito detectives (1974)
 El primer paso... de la mujer (1974)
 The Bricklayer (1975)
 Maten al león (1977)
 Los indolentes (1979)
 Ángela Morante, ¿crimen o suicidio? (1980)
 La Pachanga (1981)
 Ángel de Barrio (1982)
 Mexican, You Can Do It'' (1985)

References

External links

1938 births
1986 deaths
Film directors from Mexico City
20th-century Mexican screenwriters
20th-century Mexican male writers